The Winifred Burks-Houck Professional Leadership Awards are rewarded annually by the National Organization for the Professional Advancement of Black Chemists and Chemical Engineers (NOBCChE) to recognize the contributions of African American Women in scientific and technological fields of study and work. The award is named for Winifred Burks-Houck, environmental chemist and the first female president of NOBCChE.

The award seeks to highlight achievements in science, technology, engineering and math; leadership; creativity; community service; and entrepreneurship.

History 
Winifred Burks-Houck was a notable leader in the NOBCChE having established its West Coast branch and serving as its first female president for four consecutive terms. She was credited with positive change within the organization such as the increase of its chapters by more than 100%, partnerships with other scientific and engineering-related organizations, increasing NOBCChE visibility and advancing the interests of Black chemists. Though Burks-Houck had passed away in 2004, the NOBCChE in 2010 decided to honour her legacy through the creation of the Winifred Burks-Houck Professional Leadership Awards and Symposium where recipients are recognized.

Awards 
The Winifred Burks-Houck Professional Leadership Awards are awarded to three categories of recipients: Professional Leadership, Graduate Leadership, and Undergraduate Leadership. Professional women in STEM who exemplify leadership while contributing to the community and students pursuing a degree in a STEM field are considered for this award. Distinguished Lecturers are the speakers at the annual Winifred Burks-Houck Professional Leadership Symposium selected based on their status as thought leaders on STEM and roles in leadership, organizational development, entrepreneurship, and other success enabling areas.

Distinguished Lecturer
See also:Winifred Burks-Houck Awards and Lecture

 2010: Dr. Margaret E. M. Tolbert
 2011: Dr. Mae C. Jemison
 2012: Maggie Anderson
 2014: Dr. Noreen Mayberry-Khan, “The Tox Doc”
 2015: Dr. Pamela McCauley-Bush
 2016: Dr. Tashni-Ann Dubroy
 2017: Carroll A. Thomas
 2018: Dr. Alveda Williams Dow
 2019: Dr. Zakiya Wilson-Kennedy
 2020: Dr. Christina Jones

Professional Leadership Awardee
See also:Winifred Burks-Houck Awards and Lecture

 2010: Ms. Sandra Parker
 2011: Dr. Christine Grant
 2012: Dr. Sharon Barnes
 2013: Dr. Rashida Weathers
 2014: Dr. Sharon Kennedy
 2015: Dr. Jeanita Pritchett
 2017: Dr. Maria Curry-Nkasah
 2018: Dr. Connie Watson
 2019: Dr. Zakiya Wilson-Kennedy
 2020: Dr. Christina Jones
 2021: Sharon L. Walker

Graduate Leadership Awardee
See also:Winifred Burks-Houck Awards and Lecture

 2010: Kari Copeland
 2011: Tova Samuels
 2012: Dr. Racquel Jemison
 2013: Bria Dawson
 2014: Alicia Bowen
 2015: Dr. Ketura Odoi
 2017: Dr. Treva Brown
 2018: Dr. Viridiana Herrera
 2019: Otega Ejegbavwo
 2020: Sondrica Grimes
 2021: Dayna Patterson

Undergraduate Leadership Awardee
See also:Winifred Burks-Houck Awards and Lecture

 2010: Sharon Patrice Anderson
 2011: Kaetochi Okemgbo
 2012: Dr. Trishelle M. Copeland-Johnson
 2013: Dr. Edikan Archibong
 2015: Ashley McCray
 2016: Samantha Mensah
 2017: Patience Mukashyaka
 2018: Raven Richardson
 2019: Jaquesta Adams
 2020: Jordan Alford

References 

American science and technology awards
Awards established in 2010